The Calumet-Houghton Chiefs were a minor pro ice hockey team based in Calumet, Michigan. They played in the United States Hockey League during the 1972-73 season. The team was renamed the Copper Country Islanders for the 1973-74 season, and operated as the Copper Country Chiefs for two seasons from 1974 to 1976.

References

Defunct ice hockey teams in the United States
United States Hockey League teams
Ice hockey clubs established in 1972
1972 establishments in Michigan
1976 disestablishments in Michigan
Ice hockey clubs disestablished in 1976
Houghton County, Michigan